This is a list of members of the Belgian Senate, arranged alphabetically by type, during the 54th legislature from 2014 until 2019. This was the first legislature following the sixth Belgian state reform, which abolished direct elections for the Senate and reduced its powers.

Seat division

List

Changes during the legislature
 Bianca Debaets (CD&V), who became in July 2014 state secretary in the Brussels Government, was replaced by Brigitte Grouwels (the previous CD&V member of the Brussels Government) as senator.
 Geert Bourgeois, Philippe Muyters and Ben Weyts (N-VA) became ministers of the Flemish Government in July 2014 and were therefore replaced as senators for the Flemish Parliament by respectively Piet De Bruyn, Andries Gryffroy and Jan Van Esbroeck.
 Christophe Lacroix (PS) became minister of the Walloon Government juli 2014 and was therefore replaced as co-opted senator by Philippe Mahoux.
 Elke Sleurs (N-VA) became state-secretary in the federal government Michel Government and will therefore be replaced as senator for the Flemish Parliament, with the successor still to be named.

Bureau

President and Vice-Presidents

College of Quaestors

Floor leaders

List of Belgian Senators
Belgian Senate
2010s in Belgium